is a passenger railway station located in Nishi-ku, Sakai, Osaka Prefecture, Japan, operated by the private railway operator Nankai Electric Railway. It has the station number "NK13".

Lines

Layout
The station consists of two opposed elevated side platforms with the station building underneath.

Platforms

Adjacent stations

History
Ishizugawa Station opened on 1 June 1919.

Passenger statistics
In fiscal 2019, the station was used by an average of 14,488 passengers daily.

Surrounding area
 Ishizugawa River
 Sakai Senboku Seaside Industrial Zone
 Sakai City Hamadera Ishizuchu Elementary School

See also
 List of railway stations in Japan

References

External links

  

Railway stations in Japan opened in 1919
Railway stations in Osaka Prefecture
Sakai, Osaka